Encyclia adenocaula is a species of epiphytic orchid of light purple flowers, native to forests in Mexico.

Description
The orchid species is a small to medium-sized, cool growing, epiphytic species, with clustered, ovoid to subconical pseudobulbs carrying 2 to 3, towards the apex, strap-shaped to linear, acute or obtuse apically, gradually narrowing below into the base leaves. It blooms in the summer on an apical, to a 3 foot+ [90 cm+] long, paniculate, many flowered inflorescence that has a warty rachis, pedicel and ovary, as well as long-lasting, fragrant flowers.

The flowers are rosy-pink to magenta, star-shaped flowers with narrow petals. The long pointed lip has dark pink markings and an interesting winged column.

Distribution and habitat
Encyclia adenocaula grows in dry forests of oak and or pine at altitudes of 1000 to 2000 meters in the western Durango, Sinaloa, Jalisco, Michoacan, Guerrero and Mexico states of Mexico.

Gallery

References

External links
 
 
 Kew
 Orchidroots.org
 OrchidSpecies.com

adenocaula
adenocaula
Endemic orchids of Mexico
Flora of North America
Flora of Mexico
Orchids of North America
Orchids of Mexico
Plants described in 1825